St John the Baptist, now the Christ Apostolic Church, is a grade II listed building at 23 Highgate Road, Kentish Town, London.

The site was originally the location of an ancient chapel-of-ease which was replaced in 1783 with a church designed by the architect James Wyatt.

That church was in turn substantially rebuilt in 1843-45 by James Hakewill although the nave walls and apse of the original church were reused in the new church. The church became redundant in 1993 and was used for all-night raves but more recently it has been taken over by the Christ Apostolic Church UK and is used as a place or worship once more.

The church is on Historic England's Heritage at Risk register.

References

External links 
https://www.flickr.com/photos/50780708@N02/5588680851

St John the Baptist, Kentish Town
John the Baptist, St
John the Baptist, St